The 1895 Prime Minister's Resignation Honours were announced in the British national press on 1 July 1895 following the resignation of Lord Rosebery's government on 22 June. The appointments to the Order of the Bath appeared officially in the London Gazette of 2 July.

Earl
Lord Houghton
Lord Carrington

Baron
The Right Hon. Sir H. B. Loch, G.C.B.
The Right Hon. Herbert Gardner, M.P.
Mr Sydney Stern, M.P.
Mr James Williamson, M.P.

Baronet
Mr James Blyth, a Governor of the Royal Agricultural Society.
Mr William Agnew.
Captain Naylor Leyland.
Sir Joseph Renals, Lord Mayor of London.
Mr James Bell, Lord Provost of Glasgow.

Knight Bachelor
Mr Arthur Arnold, Chairman of the London County Council.
Colonel E. T. Gourley, M.P.
Mr Clarence Smith, M.P. for Kingston upon Hull East
Mr Frederick Howard.
Dr H. D. Littlejohn.
Mr Cowasjee Jehanghir.
Mr James Low, Lord Provost of Dundee.

Privy Counsellor
Sir Ralph Thompson, K.C.B., late Under-Secretary of State for War.
Sir Bernhard Samuelson, Bart., M.P.

Order of the Star of India

Knight Grand Cross of the Order of the Star of India (GCSI)
The Right Hon. Henry Hartley Fowler, M.P.

The Most Honourable Order of the Bath

Knight Grand Cross of the Order of the Bath (GCB)
The Right Hon. Henry Campbell-Bannerman.

Knight Commander of the Order of the Bath (KCB)
Colonel Vivian Dering Majendie, C.B., Inspector of Explosives, Home Office.
Robert Giffen, Esq., C.B., Comptroller-General of the Commercial, Labour, and Statistical Department, Board of Trade.
Alfred Milner, Esq., C.B., Chairman of the Board of Inland Revenue.

Commander of the Order of the Bath (CB)
William John Courthope, Esq., First Commissioner, Civil Service Commission.
John Roche Dasent, Esq., Education Department.
Maurice William Ernest de Bunsen, Esq., Chargé d'Affaires and Consul-General, Siam.
Colonel Robert Bruce Fellows, retired, late 4th Battalion, Bedfordshire Regiment, Deputy Clerk of Council and Chief Clerk, Privy Council.
Henry John Lowndes Graham, Esq., Clerk of the Parliaments.
Arthur Henry Hardinge, Esq., Political Agent and Consul-General, Zanzibar.
Charles Hardinge, Esq., commonly called the Honourable Charles Hardinge, a Second Secretary in the Diplomatic Service.
Edward Stanley Hope, Esq., one of the Charity Commissioners.
Francis John Stephens Hopwood, Esq., C.M.G., one of the Assistant Secretaries, Board of Trade.
John Wesley Judd, Esq., Professor of Geology, Royal College of Science.
Edward Chandos Leigh, Esq., Q.C., commonly called the Honourable Edward Chandos Leigh, Q.C., Counsel to the Speaker.
Captain Frederick John Dealtry Lugard, D.S.O., Norfolk Regiment.
Reginald MacLeod, Esq., the Queen's and Lord Treasurer's Remembrancer, Scotland.
Alfred Richard Pennefather, Esq., Receiver for the Metropolitan Police District, and for the Police Courts of the *Metropolis.
Alfred de Bock Porter, Esq., Secretary to the Ecclesiastical Commissioners.
Stephen Edward Spring-Rice, Esq., one of the Principal Clerks in the Treasury.
Armine Wodehouse, Esq., commonly called the Honourable Armine Wodehouse, Private Secretary to the late Secretary of State for Foreign Affairs.

References

1895 in the United Kingdom
Prime Minister's Resignation Honours
1895 awards